Singapore is competing at the 2013 World Aquatics Championships in Barcelona, Spain between 19 July and 4 August 2013.

Swimming

Singaporean swimmers achieved qualifying standards in the following events (up to a maximum of 2 swimmers in each event at the A-standard entry time, and 1 at the B-standard):

Men

Women

Synchronized swimming

Singapore has qualified eight synchronized swimmers.

References

External links
Barcelona 2013 Official Site
Singapore Swimming Association

Nations at the 2013 World Aquatics Championships
World Aquatics Championships
Singapore at the World Aquatics Championships